Kamu may refer to:

 KAMU-FM and KAMU-TV, public broadcasting stations run by Texas A&M University in College Station, Texas
 Jowsheqan va Kamu, a city in Iran
 Kamu language, an extinct indigenous Australian language
 KAMU or KAMA in Shona is a hair comb